The New York City Department of Health and Mental Hygiene is the department of the government of New York City responsible for public health along with issuing birth certificates, dog licenses, and conducting restaurant inspection and enforcement. The New York City Board of Health is part of the department. Its regulations are compiled in title 24 of the New York City Rules (the New York City Health Code). Since March 2022, the commissioner has been Ashwin Vasan.

Organization
NYC is organized into 30 health districts (sometimes referred to as health center districts), themselves composed of 354 health areas which are sets of census tracts. NYC is also organized into 17 mental health regions.

History
The department was initially set up as the Health Committee (later Commission), a quasi-governmental public health group in response to a yellow fever outbreak in Philadelphia in 1793. Governor John Jay made a proclamation on 13 September 1793 to establish this to regulate the ports of the city and ensure proper quarantines. Three days later, the city, under the leadership of Mayor Richard Varick, created a tandem committee that ensured both private and commercial needs would be addressed. New York would see additional epidemics in 1795, 1796, 1798, 1799, and 1800, which lead to the creation of the 'New York City Board of Health', which held its first meeting in 1805.

In 1866, the New York State legislature enacted a bill establishing the 'Metropolitan Board of Health', consisting of the four Police Commissioners, four Health Commissioners appointed by the Governor, and the Health Officer for the Port of New York. In 1870, the legislature replaced the Board of Health with the Department of Health, with additional responsibilities including street cleaning and sanitary permits.

As of December 1894, Charles G. Wilson was serving as President of the Board of Health.

As a result of its consolidation with the Department of Mental Health, Mental Retardation and Alcoholism Services, it was renamed the Department of Health and Mental Hygiene on July 29, 2002. In 2021, Michelle E. Morse was named the first Chief Medical Officer of the New York City Department of Health and Mental Hygiene.

Organization
New York City Board of Health
Commissioner of Health
General Counsel
Chief Medical Examiner
Executive Deputy Commissioner and Chief Operating Officer
Deputy Commissioner for Mental Hygiene
Alcohol and Drug Treatment
Child and Adolescent Services
Mental Health
Developmental Disabilities
Systems Strengthening and Access
Deputy Commissioner for Disease Control
Communicable Diseases
HIV/AIDS Prevention and Control
Immunization
Public Health Laboratory
STI Prevention and Control
Tuberculosis Control
Deputy Commissioner for Environmental Health
Environmental Disease Prevention
Environmental Emergency Preparedness and Response
Environmental Sciences and Engineering
Environmental Surveillance and Policy
Food Safety and Community Sanitation
Poison Control Center
Veterinary and Pest Control
Deputy Commissioner for Epidemiology
Epidemiology Services
Vital Statistics
Public Health Training
World Trade Center Health Registry
Deputy Commissioner for Health Care Access and Improvement
Correctional Health Services
Primary Care Access and Planning
Primary Care Information Project
Information Technology Initiatives
Deputy Commissioner for Health Promotion and Disease Prevention
Chronic Disease Prevention and Tobacco Control
District Public Health Offices
Maternal, Infant and Reproductive Health
School Health
Deputy Commissioner for Administration
Deputy Commissioner for Finance
Deputy Commissioner and Chief Information Officer
Deputy Commissioner for Emergency Preparedness and Response

Board of Health
The New York City Board of Health is part of the Department of Health and Mental Hygiene and consists of the commissioner of the department, the chairperson of the department's Mental Hygiene Advisory Board, and nine other members appointed by the mayor.

See also
 New York City Office of Administrative Trials and Hearings (OATH), for hearings conducted on certain summonses issued by the Department
 New York City Health and Hospitals Corporation
 New York State Department of Health
 New York State Department of Mental Hygiene
 Metropolitan Board of Health
 Sugary Drinks Portion Cap Rule

References

External links
 
 Title 24: Department of Health and Mental Hygiene (incl. the New York City Health Code) in the New York City Rules from American Legal Publishing
 DOHMH proposed and adopted New York City Rules from the Mayor's Office of Operations

Healthcare in New York City
Health and Mental Hygiene
Health departments in the United States
1805 establishments in New York (state)
Medical and health organizations based in New York City
New York City Department of Health and Mental Hygiene